The 2018 SMU Mustangs men's soccer team represented the Southern Methodist University during the 2018 NCAA Division I men's soccer season and the 2018 American Athletic Conference men's soccer season. The regular season began on August 24 and concluded on November 2. It was the program's 44th season fielding a men's varsity soccer team, and their 6th season in the AAC. The 2018 season was Kevin Hudson's fourth year as head coach for the program.

Roster

Schedule 

|-
!colspan=6 style=""| SMU Tournament

|-
!colspan=6 style=""| Non-conference regular season
|-

|-
!colspan=6 style=""| American Athletic Conference regular season
|-

|-
!colspan=6 style=""| American Athletic Conference Tournament

|-
!colspan=6 style=""| NCAA Tournament

|-

See also 
 2018 SMU Mustangs women's soccer team

References 

2018
2018 American Athletic Conference men's soccer season
American men's college soccer teams 2018 season
2018 in sports in Texas